Jerzy Kryszak (born 24 April 1950 in Kalisz, Poland) is a Polish actor.

Career
He graduated Ludwik Solski Academy for the Dramatic Arts in Kraków in 1974, and debuted on stage that year. He acted at the Juliusz Słowacki Theatre in Kraków (1974-1978) and at the Ateneum Theatre in Warszawa (1978-1993). Apart from appearing in films, TV miniseries and television dramas, he gained popularity thanks to numerous satirical TV shows by Telewizja Polska (notably Polskie Zoo) and he also directed some of them. In the mid-1990s he also became a satirist performing stand-up comedy specializing in political commentary (with elements of parody), touring Poland and Polonia centers in the United States, Canada, Australia, Germany, Sweden and Austria. His performances were televised by TVP, Polsat and TV4, and he has also appeared in shows produced by HBO Comedy (Poland).

Selected filmography 
 Wodzirej (1977)
 Aktorzy prowincjonalni (1978)
 Dolina Issy (1982)
 Thais (1983)
 Podróże Pana Kleksa (1985)
 Żelazną ręką (1989)

TV series
 Alternatywy 4 (1983)
 Tulipan (1986)
 Kanclerz (1989)
 Marie Curie: Une femme honorable (1990)
 Dylematu 5 (2007)
 Synowie (2009)

Polish dubbing in several animated films.

References

External links

Jerzy Kryszak filmography at filmpolski.pl 
Jerzy Kryszak theatre work at e-teatr.pl 

1950 births
Living people
People from Kalisz
Polish male stage actors
Polish male film actors
Polish male television actors
Polish male voice actors
Polish satirists
Polish male writers
Polish cabaret performers
20th-century Polish male actors